Irkutskenergo is a power company in Russia.  It mainly focus on the generation of hydroelectricity.

The company's hydroelectric facilities are located on the Angara River: Irkutsk, Bratsk, and Ust-Ilimsk hydroelectric power plants.  In addition, the company owns 13 coal-fired combined heat and power plants.  The total installed capacity of Irkutskenergo is 12,879.9 MW of electric power and 13,002 Gcal/hour of thermal power.

Ownership
Irkutskenergo is controlled by EuroSibEnergo, a subsidiary of Oleg Deripaska owned En+ Group, which owns a 90.8% share in the company. The rest of shares is traded on the Moscow Exchange.

Inter RAO previously owned 40% of shares. RusHydro had shown its interest to acquire stake owned by Inter RAO.

See also

Bratsk hydroelectric plant

References

External links

Electric power companies of Russia
Companies based in Irkutsk
Companies listed on the Moscow Exchange
Hydroelectric power companies of Russia